The Battle of Zvolen was a battle between the Kuruc's and the army of Habsburg monarchy on 15 November 1703 at Zvolen in Upper Hungary (modern day Slovakia). General Miklós Bercsényi was routed by the Austrian army under Simon Forgách. Forgách in 1704 went over to the Kuruc side.

Prelude 
On 15 June Francis II Rákóczi sparked off the war of independence against Emperor Leopold I. First Rákóczi found little support in Hungary and also the nobility and peasants fought against the Kurucs. Miklós Bercsényi soon brought mercenaries from Poland, Moldavia and the Ruthenian (Western Ukrainian) regions. The Kuruc forces and his mercenaries (with the Slovak and Rusyn minorities) pushed forward into the Austrian border. On 17 September Levice was captured by the Kurucs but the Austrian army recaptured it on 31 October.

Opposing forces 
 brigadier joined Bercsényi after the capture of Levice. The Kuruc and Austrian army was mostly cavalry. The Kuruc forces have irregular Hungarian and Slovak horsemen, some regular horsemen, well-trained Polish and Ruthenian cavalry, some thousand veteran haiduks from Great Turkish War, French officiers and soldiers, and Moravian artillerymen with obsolete guns. Bercsényi's lieutenants was Sándor Károlyi and Ocskay.

In the Austrian army two regiment infantry with muskets, some platoons of Serbian fusiliers from Vojvodina, Hungarian Royalists and Danish dragoons. His commanders was also Hungarians: Forgách, Bottyán the Blind and Antal Esterházy (later everyone Kuruc commanders).

In both camps were disagreements between the commanders. Another Austrian army was in Bystrica under Leopold Schlick, just celebrated his name day, assist those not bothered about Forgáchs.

The battle 
The Kuruc and Austrian army glared at each other for a long time. The thirst tormented the troops, there was little water. Before the battle Bottyán and Ocskay dueled, and both injured. In the battle the Kuruc forces repulsed the Austrians and their allies.

After the battle Austrians locked themselves in Zvolen. Bercsényi tried to starve them. During the night, most of the army tried to break out of the castle. But Ocskay raided the Austrians and destroyed them; very small soldiers reached the camp of Schlick in Bystrica.

Aftermath 
The wounded Bottyán was the Zvolen castle for three weeks. On 7 December they surrendered in exchange for a free getaway. The Kurucs occupied the country between Levice and Zvolen, and in several battles defeated the Austrian, Danish and Serbian forces.

Sources 
 Zólyom – vártörténet (magyar-varak.hu)
 Jókai Mór: Szeretve mind a vérpadig (mek.oszk.hu)

Battles involving Hungary
Battles involving Austria
Battles involving Denmark
Battles involving France
Slovakia under Habsburg rule
1703 in the Habsburg monarchy
18th century in Hungary
Conflicts in 1703
Zvolen
Rákóczi's War of Independence